This is a list of the winners of the Amnesty International UK Media Awards for each year since 2002. These awards are given by the UK section of Amnesty International to journalists who have made a significant contribution to the UK public's greater awareness and understanding of human rights issues.

Earlier recipients of the Special Award for Human Rights Journalism under Threat included Ignacio Gomez of Colombia, special investigations editor of the newspaper El Espectador and director of the Colombian Press Freedom Foundation, who won the award in 2000; Najam Sethi of Pakistan, editor of the national newspaper, The Friday Times; and editor Nosa Igiebor and the staff of Nigeria's Tell Magazine.

Award winners

References

External links
 
 

Amnesty International UK Media Awards winners